MultiThématiques is a French company created in 1988, that publishes thematic television channels broadcast by cable and by satellite on the Canalsat satellite provider. The president and CEO of the company is Michel Denisot.

History
MultiThématiques is 100% owned by Canal+ France. 20% by Lagardère Group and 80% by Canal+ Group, which itself is a subsidiary of the Vivendi.

Channels 
 Ciné+ Premier (HD)
 Ciné+ Famiz (HD)
 Ciné+ Émotion (HD)
 Ciné+ Frisson
 Ciné+ Club
 Ciné+ Classic
Polar+
 Comédie+
Olimpia TV
 Piwi+
 Télétoon+
 Télétoon+ 1
 Planète+ (HD)

 Planète+ Adventure
 Planète+ Crime
 Seasons
 Infosport+
 Rugby+
 Foot+
 Golf+
 A voir ce soir (Channel Guide)

Others : 
 Eurochannel

No longer being aired : 
 CinéCinéma Info (old, Allociné TV then CinéInfo)
 Planète Juniors (old, Ma Planète)
 Campus Bac
 Planète+ Thalassa (old, Planète 2)
 Planète+ No Limit (old, Planète Future then Planète Choc)
 Planète+ Justice
 Jimmy
 Cuisine+
 Sport+
 Maison+
 Ciné+ Star

Planète + was chosen by CSA to be part of the pay offer of digital terrestrial television in France. It is accessible in the Canalsat Minipack to the TNT at a price of €7 / month (with Eurosport, Paris Première and Canal J).

References

External links
 

 
Television production companies of France
Groupe Canal+
Companies established in 1988
1988 establishments in France
Mass media in Paris